Crosskirk  is a small remote hamlet, overlooking Crosskirk Bay, in Caithness, Scottish Highlands and is in the Scottish council area of Highland.

The hamlet of Crosskirk is situated less than 1 mile north east of Forss and 3 miles west of Thurso.
The ancient Crosskirk Broch fortification used to stand on a promontory near the hamlet, but has been eroded into the sea.

References

Populated places in Caithness